Emily Spivey (born September 29, 1971) is an American television writer, producer, actress, and comedian. Spivey is best known as the creator of the series Up All Night and Bless the Harts. She previously worked as a staff writer on Saturday Night Live from 2001 to 2010. She won an Emmy Award in 2002 and a WGA Award in 2008, both for her work on Saturday Night Live.

Early life and education
Spivey was born in Statesville, North Carolina and grew up in High Point, North Carolina. She graduated from T. Wingate Andrews High School. She earned her bachelor's degree from University of North Carolina at Greensboro and her master's degree from Loyola Marymount University in Los Angeles.

Career 
In Los Angeles, she joined The Groundlings. Spivey wrote for the show King of the Hill, which she left to go write for Saturday Night Live in 2001. In addition to writing the script, Spivey is also part of the ensemble cast of the Netflix movie Wine Country.

Personal life 
Spivey is married to film editor Scott Philbrook. They have a son born in 2009.

Writing credits
MADtv (2000–2001)
King of the Hill (2002)
Saturday Night Live (2001–2010)
Parks and Recreation (2011)
Up All Night (2011–2012) - Creator (debut)
Murder Police (2013) - Unaired pilot
Modern Family (2013) 
The Last Man on Earth (2015–2016)
Maya & Marty (2016)
Masterminds (2016)
Wine Country (2019)
Bless the Harts (2019) - Creator

Filmography

References

External links
 

1971 births
Living people
American comedy writers
American television producers
American voice actresses
University of North Carolina at Greensboro alumni
American women television producers
American television writers
Primetime Emmy Award winners
Place of birth missing (living people)
Writers Guild of America Award winners
American women television writers
21st-century American actresses
21st-century American writers
Showrunners
20th-century American women writers
21st-century American women writers